Tyler Henry Koelewyn (born 1996) is an American reality show personality who appears in the reality show series Hollywood Medium with Tyler Henry and Life After Death with Tyler Henry as a clairvoyant medium since 2016. He has published two books. 

Critics have alleged that Henry's readings are performed using deceptive cold reading and hot reading techniques, and not "psychic" powers.

Personal life
Henry is a native of Hanford, California, a small rural city near Fresno. He graduated from Hanford's Sierra Pacific High School and didn't attend college. 
Henry is openly gay.

Career 
According to Henry, he noticed that he had clairvoyant abilities when he was ten years old. 

In November 2015, Henry appeared on Keeping Up with the Kardashians where he gave a reading to one of the Kardashian sisters.

In January 2016, Hollywood Medium With Tyler Henry premiered on E!. In March 2016, it was announced that E! had ordered a second season of the show. Henry published a memoir titled Between Two Worlds: Lessons from the Other Side the same year. In 2022, he published a second book, Here & Hereafter: How Wisdom from the Departed Can Transform Your Life Now.

In February 2018, People printed an article in advance of the third season of Hollywood Medium. The article detailed Henry's claims about his abilities, the development of his "powers", and his reading with La Toya Jackson set to air in the new season, in which he claimed to contact Michael Jackson.

Hollywood Medium ended after four seasons in 2019. His next series, Life After Death with Tyler Henry, premiered on March 11, 2022, on Netflix.

Henry has given readings to many celebrities, such as Nancy Grace, Alan Thicke, retired NBA player John Salley and actors Monica Potter, Amber Rose, Jaleel White, the Kardashians, Corey Feldman, Carmen Electra, Matt Lauer, Chad Michael Murray, Rick Fox, Megan Fox, Chrissy Metz, Kristin Cavallari, Bobby Brown, Roselyn Sanchez, The Try Guys, and Tom Arnold.

Death of Alan Thicke 
On December 13, 2016, actor Alan Thicke died due to aortic dissection at the age of 69. Several months before his death, Thicke was the subject of a reading done for the Hollywood Medium TV show. Among the many topics discussed by Henry, the concern of possible heart problems was addressed, with Henry suggesting that Thicke had a heart problem like "multiple men" in Thicke's family. After Thicke died, this part of his reading was referenced by Henry's fans as evidence that Henry had actually predicted Thicke's death. Various news outlets reported on this. Scientific skepticism activist Susan Gerbic challenged the claim that this was a successful psychic prediction, arguing that "Henry was again playing the odds" given that heart disease is the "number one cause of death for American males".

Critical analysis 
It is the opinion of scientific skeptics that mediumship is a con and that Henry is no exception. Skeptical activists and others concerned with Henry's rise in popularity have actively attempted to counter the public perception that what Henry claims to do reflects reality. In particular, they have argued that Henry relies on a mix of cold reading techniques and prior knowledge of his subjects, or hot reading, to make his claims. Specific examples where it is alleged that he used these techniques include sessions with Ronda Rousey, Carole Radziwill, Matt Lauer, and Nancy Grace. 

Critics have argued that Henry's actions are exploitative, and he has been dismissed as one of many mediums who lack training in counselling, resulting in a "tremendous" risk of harm. Henry reportedly welcomes skepticism about his work: "I am content with people asking questions", he stated in 2016.

See also
 Long Island Medium
 Monica the Medium

References

External links
 
 

American psychics
American spiritual mediums
Gay entertainers
American LGBT entertainers
LGBT people from California
Living people
Mediumship
Participants in American reality television series
People from Hanford, California
Year of birth missing (living people)
1996 births